Amy B. Heimberger is an American neurosurgeon and physician-scientist. She is the Jean Malnati Miller Professor of Neurological Surgery, vice-chair for research in the department of neurological Surgery at Feinberg School of Medicine and scientific director of The Malnati Brain Tumor Institute at the Robert H. Lurie Comprehensive Cancer Center.

Heimberger completed a B.A. at University of Missouri in 1989. She earned a M.D. from Washington University School of Medicine in 1995. She finished her internship in surgery (1996) and residency in neurosurgery (1970) at Duke University Hospital. She won a Presidential Early Career Award for Scientists and Engineers for her research on central nervous system immune biology while working at the University of Texas.

In September 2021, Heimberger was appointed by U.S. president Joe Biden to the National Cancer Institute's National Cancer Advisory.

References

External links
 

Living people
Year of birth missing (living people)
Place of birth missing (living people)
American neurosurgeons
Cancer researchers
American medical researchers
Women medical researchers
21st-century American women physicians
21st-century American physicians
21st-century American women scientists
Physician-scientists
Northwestern University faculty
University of Missouri alumni
Washington University School of Medicine alumni
Women surgeons
Biden administration personnel